Nicola Napolitano (born 22 January 1983) is an Italian footballer who plays for Manfredonia at Lega Pro Seconda Divisione.

Napolitano started his career at hometown club and Italian giant Internazionale.

He made professional debut on 19 December 2002, a Coppa Italia match against Bari. In August 2003, he was loaned to Spezia of Serie C1. In July 2005, he was loaned to Pavia along with Riccardo Meggiorini.

Since released by Inter in summer 2007, he was signed by Gubbio of Lega Pro Seconda Divisione in January 2008. After unattached again, he was signed by Manfredonia of same level in January 2009.

References

External links

archivio.inter.it

Italian footballers
Inter Milan players
Spezia Calcio players
F.C. Pavia players
U.S. Cremonese players
A.S.D. Victor San Marino players
Serie A players
Association football midfielders
Footballers from Milan
1983 births
Living people
A.S. Gubbio 1910 players